In shogi, Bishop Exchange Climbing Silver (角換わり棒銀 kakugawari bōgin) is a Bishop Exchange (Double Static Rook) opening that uses a Climbing Silver attacking formation with the left silver.

See also

 Bishop Exchange
 Climbing Silver
 Bishop Exchange Reclining Silver
 Bishop Exchange Rushing Silver
 Tempo Loss Bishop Exchange
 Wrong Diagonal Bishop Exchange
 Static Rook

Bibliography

External links

 HIDETCHI's YouTube videos:
 Shogi Openings: Bishop Exchange #1  · Climbing Silver played by Black in Bishop Exchange (from 11 min 58 sec to 19 min 40 sec) 
 Shogi Openings: Bishop Exchange #2  · Merits of Climbing Silver vs other silver strategies in Bishop Exchange 
 Shogi Openings: Bishop Exchange #4 (white's one-turn loss bishop exchange)  · Climbing Silver in One-Turn Loss Bishop Exchange (from 8 min 24 sec to 9 min 54 sec) 
 Yamajunn's Basic Shogi Opening: Kakugawari
 Shogi Shack: Bishop Exchanged Climbing Silver
 Yet Another Shogi Site:
 Normal Bishop Exchange: Sente Climbing Silver
 Normal Bishop Exchange: Gote Climbing Silver
 Shogi in English: Bishop Exchange Climbing Silver
 Quest of the Lost Systems: 
 Kakugawari 4: Bogin
 Kakugawari 5: Bogin
 Kakugawari 6: Bogin
 Kakugawari 7: Bogin
 Kakugawari 8: Bogin

Shogi openings
Bishop Exchange openings